Thitathorn Aksornsri (born 8 November 1997) is a Thai professional footballer who plays as a left back for Thai League 1 club PT Prachuap.

International career
In September 2019, Thitathorn was called up to the Thailand U23 for the SEA Games. In January 2020, He played the 2020 AFC U-23 Championship with Thailand U23.

Personal life
Thitathorn's twin younger brother Thitawee, who is also a footballer and plays as a right back. His older brother, Tatpicha Aksornsri, is also a footballer and plays as a goalkeeper.

References

External links
Thitathorn Aksornsri at Soccerway

1997 births
Living people
Thitathorn Aksornsri
Thitathorn Aksornsri
Association football defenders
Thitathorn Aksornsri
Thitathorn Aksornsri
Thitathorn Aksornsri
Thitathorn Aksornsri
Competitors at the 2019 Southeast Asian Games
Twin sportspeople
Thitathorn Aksornsri
Thitathorn Aksornsri
Thitathorn Aksornsri